George Galesiotes (Greek: Γεώργιος Γαλησιώτης, c. 1275/1280−1357) was a high-ranking Byzantine official of the Patriarchate of Constantinople who studied under the tutelage of Manuel Holobolos. Upon becoming an official of the Patriarchate, Galesiotes was in charge of the sakellion of the Church from around 1330 and 1346. Along with being a Church official, Galesiotes also became an author of speeches and other works.

References

Sources

13th-century births
1357 deaths
Byzantine officials
14th-century Byzantine people
14th-century Byzantine writers
Ecumenical Patriarchate of Constantinople